Julia Kova (real name , ; b. February 5, 1985 in Moscow) is a Russian singer.

At 17 years old, she was chosen as "Miss Russia Universe 2003", but was unable to compete in Miss Universe pageant due to her age. Julia participated in the Miss Europe beauty pageant later that year instead.

Later she moved to the USA, changed her stage name to "Julia Kova" and started singing in English. Now she lives in Miami.

Singles
As "Джульетта":
Под дождем (2004)
Помни Меня (2005)

Videography
Нелегальный ангел (2003)
Конфетный мальчик (2004)
Crush (2005)
Beep Beep (2007)
Sorry (2007)
Don't Go For Anything But Love (2007)

Discography
Julia Kova — «Это я» (2007)

 Бип-Бип (Feat. Scott Storch & Stacks)
 Sorry (Feat. Honorrebel)
 Maмa Нe Ругай (Feat. Stacks)
 Апельсины (Feat. Nox)
 Немножко (Feat. Stacks)
 Если Ты Любишь Очень (Feat. Nox)
 Заходи (Feat. Honorrebel)
 Это Я (Секреты)
 Взгляды-Заточки
 Признайся

References

External links
Unofficial website
official website
Twitter
 twitter

1985 births
Living people
Russian beauty pageant winners
Russian pop singers
Singers from Moscow
21st-century Russian singers
21st-century Russian women singers